This Just In with Max Kellerman is an American television sports talk program on ESPN, hosted by Max Kellerman. The show premiered on September 14, 2021, and airs live on weekdays at 2 p.m. ET/11 a.m. PT.

The show includes latest news, opinion and analysis on the day's headlines, and a look ahead at the evening in sports.

Segments
 “The Agenda” – a fast-paced look at the storylines for the night ahead
 “Afternoon Weigh In” – A deep-dive from Kellerman on a trending topic
 “Best Bets” – a breakdown of the night's most important games with key stats and betting information
 "QB Sneak” – evaluations of recent quarterback performances from Kellerman and NFL analysts

References

2020s American television talk shows
2021 American television series debuts
American sports television series
English-language television shows
ESPN original programming